Black Jesus (lit. "Sitting to his right") is a 1968 Italian drama film co-written and directed by Valerio Zurlini and starring Woody Strode. It is inspired by the finals days of the first Prime Minister of the Democratic Republic of the Congo Patrice Lumumba. It was listed to compete at the 1968 Cannes Film Festival, but the festival was cancelled due to the May 1968 events in France.

Synopsis
Rebel Maurice Lalubi is arrested by the military on trumped up charges and tortured, which turns him into a martyr. Inspired by the final days of the first democratic Congolese leader, Patrice Lumumba.

Cast
 Woody Strode as Maurice Lalubi
 Franco Citti as Oreste
 Jean Servais as Commander
 Pier Paolo Capponi as Officer
 Stephen Forsyth as Prisoner (as Stephen Forsyth)
 Luciano Lorcas as Sergent (as Luciano Lorcas)
 Salvatore Basile (as Salvo Basile)
 Giuseppe Transocchi
 Silvio Fiore
 Renzo Rossi
 Mirella Pamphili (as Mirella Panfili)
 Bruno Corazzari as Torturer (uncredited)
 Inigo Lezzi as Soldier (uncredited)

References

External links
 

1968 films
1968 drama films
Italian drama films
1960s Italian-language films
Films directed by Valerio Zurlini
Films set in the Democratic Republic of the Congo
1960s Italian films